Hypocysta metirius, the common brown ringlet, is a species of butterfly of the family Nymphalidae. It is found along the east coast of Australia, including Queensland, New South Wales and Victoria.

The wingspan is about 30 mm. Adults are brown, with an orange patch on each hindwing ending in an eyespot. The underside of the wings is brown with two eyespots on the hindwings.

The larvae feed on Gahnia clarkei, Eriachne pallescens, Alexfloydia repens, Cynodon dactylon and Imperata species. They are green or brown with dark lines along the body. Full-grow larvae are about 20 mm long. Pupation takes place in a brown pupa, which is attached to a stem.

References

Satyrini
Butterflies described in 1875
Butterflies of Australia
Taxa named by Arthur Gardiner Butler